South Texas Suite is an EP by Canadian-American country singer-songwriter Whitney Rose. It was released on January 27, 2017 by both Six Shooter Records and Thirty Tigers.

Track listing
 "Three Minute Love Affair"
 "Analog"
 "My Boots"
 "Bluebonnets for My Baby"
 "Lookin' Back on Luckenbach"
 "How 'Bout a Hand for the Band"

Personnel
Earl Poole Ball – piano
Cris Burns – engineering, mastering, mixing
Bryce Clarke –	electric and acoustic guitars
Ben Clarkson –	artwork
Michael Guerra – accordion
Erik Hokkanen – fiddle
Sophia Johnson – acoustic guitar
Terri Joyce – composition
Brennen Leigh – composition
Tom Lewis – drums, percussion
James Mejia – design, layout
Whitney Rose –	composition, production, vocals
James Shelton – steel guitar
Kevin Smith – bass
Redd Volkaert – electric guitar

References

2017 EPs
Six Shooter Records EPs
Whitney Rose albums
Country music EPs